Stapari (Serbian Cyrillic:  Стапари) is a village located in the Užice municipality of Serbia. In the 2002 census, the village had a population of 974.

Remnants of material culture from the early Stone Age (ceramics, tools and weapons) were found in Stapari. The remnants of the material culture prove that even in the Iron Age the place was lively.
Stapari the village in the municipality of Uzice in Zlatibor district. According to the census of 2002. There were 974 people (according to the census of 1991.  It was in 1181 inhabitants). In the village Stapari live 837 adult population, and the average age of the population is 45.5 years (43.0 for men and 48.2 for women). The village has 330 households, and the average number of members per household is 2.95.  This village is populated by a large part of the Serbs (according to the census of 2002. Year. Stapari Village has significant tourist potential.  In Stapari Village the two spas and mineral water sources that are good for skin persons. Also, the village Stapari has one of the best places for fishing (if not the best) on the river Djetinja.  In the attachment that goes fact and that the fish caught in Staparima of even 93 cm. 

Užice
Populated places in Zlatibor District
Archaeological sites in Serbia